Jan van Wijk (born 7 January 1962) is a Dutch former professional racing cyclist. He rode in the 1986 Tour de France.

References

External links
 

1962 births
Living people
Dutch male cyclists
Sportspeople from Haarlem
Cyclists from North Holland